John Thomas Shelton (24 January 1905 – 1 May 1941) is a former Australian rules footballer who played with St Kilda and South Melbourne. He was killed in action in Tobruk in 1941.

"Jack A. Shelton" 
As a VFL footballer, he was sometimes known as "J. A. Shelton" (rather than "J. T. Shelton" ), with the "A" most likely a reference to Avenel, in order to distinguish him from the other "Jack Shelton", one John Frederick "Jack" Shelton, a prolific goalkicker, who had been recruited from Koo Wee Rup in 1926 (and was playing for St Kilda at the same time).

Family
The son of Richard John and Jane Elizabeth Shelton (née Skinner), he was born at Avenel, Victoria, on 24 January 1905. As a young lad of 7, Jack's father had been saved from drowning in swollen Hughes Creek, Avanel, by a young Ned Kelly, aged 10.

Jack married Winifred "Freda" Emma Planck Gadd (1905–1988) on 26 March 1932. The cousin of Melbourne footballer Bill Shelton, he was the father of John Shelton (born 13 August 1933), and Hawthorn's Bill Shelton (born 13 July 1936), and the uncle of Essendon's Ian "Bluey" Shelton.

Education
He was educated at Brighton Grammar School as a boarder, and he later attended Dookie Agricultural College.

Footballer
Although he began as a forward and rover, throughout his later senior football career he played as an either a backman or in the ruck. He was a tough player who played hard and fair.

St Kilda
He received his clearance to play for St Kilda on 28 April 1926. He played eleven senior games for St Kilda in his first season, playing his first game, on the half-forward flank, against Hawthorn at the Junction Oval on 5 June 1926.

He returned to Avenel for the 1927 season; and, rejoined play with St Kilda in mid-1928, resuming his senior career in the eighth round match against Essendon, in the first ruck, at Windy Hill, on 4 June 1928. Shelton played very well in his first game back in the VFL, and St Kilda won by 9 points. He played eleven senior matches for St Kilda in 1928 (rounds 8 to 18 inclusive) and six in 1929, with his last match against Richmond, at the Punt Road Oval on 13 July 1929 (round eleven).<ref>[http://nla.gov.au/nla.news-article4021518 Poor Game: Richmond Scrambles Home, The Argus, (Monday, 15 July 1929), p.15.]</ref>

South Melbourne
He received his clearance to play for South Melbourne on 11 June 1930. He played his first match for South Melbourne, as a back-pocket ruckman, against Hawthorn on 14 June 1930 (round seven). South Melbourne thrashed Hawthorn 17.11 (119) to 9.10 (64), in its first win for the 1930 season.

He played the next two matches (rounds eight and nine), and the last four matches of the season, retiring after playing against North Melbourne at the Lake Oval on 13 September 1930. He was one of the best players in a team that soundly beat North Melbourne 15.19 (109) to 4.14 (38), having kicked 9.6 (60) to 1.1 (7) in the last quarter.

Avenel
He received his clearance to play for Avenel on 3 June 1931.
In 1934, in a match against Nagambie, he broke a collarbone.

At the time of his enlistment in the second AIF, in mid-1940, he was still playing football for Avenel, and was the captain of the Avenel team.

Soldier
Both his eldest brother, Private Richard John Shelton (1895–1967), and his second-oldest brother, Sergeant Leslie Norman Shelton (1897–1933), had served in the First AIF (they both enlisted on 19 September 1914, with Leslie producing letters of permission from his mother and father).

On 23 July 1940, Jack left his farm, "Mittagong", at Avenel and enlisted in the Second AIF aged 35.

After training at Wangaratta, he was promoted to Lieutenant, joined the 2/24th Battalion, and was sent to the Middle East, and then Northern Africa, with the 9th Division.

He was killed in action, at Tobruk, on 1 May 1941.

Remembered
His name appears on the Roll of Honour (panel 52) at the Australian War memorial. He has no known grave, and is commemorated at the Alamein Memorial, in Egypt.

Honours and awards
 1939–1945 Star
 Africa Star
 War Medal 1939–1945
 Australia Service Medal 1939–1945

See also
 List of Victorian Football League players who died in active service
 Siege of Tobruk
 The Rats of Tobruk

Notes

Footnotes

References
 Feldman, Jules & Holmesby, Russell, The Point of it All: The Story of the St Kilda Football Club, Playwright (on behalf of the St Kilda Football Club), (Sydney), 1992.
 Holmesby, Russell & Main, Jim (2007). The Encyclopedia of AFL Footballers. 7th ed. Melbourne: Bas Publishing.
 Main, J. & Allen, D., "Shelton, J.T. 'Jack'", pp. 335–337 in Main, J. & Allen, D., Fallen – The Ultimate Heroes: Footballers Who Never Returned From War, Crown Content, (Melbourne), 2002.
 Serle, R.P., The Second Twenty-fourth Australian Infantry Battalion of the 9th Australian Division: a History'', Jacaranda Press, (Brisbane), 1963.
 Deaths: On Active Service: Shelton, The Argus, Tuesday, 20 May 1941), p.4.
 Deaths: On Active Service: Shelton, The Argus, Saturday, 24 May 1941), p.4.
 Personal Notes About AIF Casualties: Lieut J. T. Shelton, The Argus, (Friday 23 May 1941), p.5.
 Casualty List: Victoria: Killed in Action (Shelton, Lieut. J. T., Avenel, Inf.), The Argus, (Friday, 30 May 1941), p.5.
 World War II Nominal Roll: John Thomas Shelton (VX47976)
 Australian War Memorial Roll of Honour: John Thomas Shelton (VX47976)
 Commonwealth War Graves Commission Casualty Details: Shelton, Thomas Jack (VX47976)
 National Archives of Australia: World War II Service Record: John Thomas Shelton (VX47976)

External links

 

1905 births
1941 deaths
Military personnel from Victoria (Australia)
People educated at Brighton Grammar School
Australian rules footballers from Victoria (Australia)
St Kilda Football Club players
Sydney Swans players
Australian military personnel killed in World War II
Australian Army personnel of World War II
Australian Army officers